A jukebox is a coin-operated music playing device.

Jukebox may also refer to:

Entertainment-related 

 "Jukebox Hero", a song by Foreigner from their 1981 album 4
 "Jukebox (Don't Put Another Dime)", a 1982 single song by The Flirts
 Jukebox (Jamaaladeen Tacuma album), a 1988 album released by jazz musician Jamaaladeen Tacuma
 Jukebox (Bent Fabric album), a 2004 album by Bent Fabric
 Jukebox (Bachman Cummings album), a 2007 covers album released by Randy Bachman and Burton Cummings
 Jukebox (Cat Power album), a 2008 covers album released by American singer Cat Power
 Jukebox (Priscilla Renea album), a 2009 album by  Priscilla Renea
 Jukebox (JLS album), a 2011 album by English boy band JLS
 Jukebox (Drifters album), 2013 album by Swedish band the Drifters
 Jukebox (Human Nature album), a 2014 album by Australian pop vocal group Human Nature
 Jukeboxer, moniker of Brooklyn-based musician Noah Wall
 Juke Box Records, a record label
 Jukebox musical, a stage musical or musical film in which a majority of the songs are well-known popular music songs, rather than original music

Computer-related 
 Dell Digital Jukebox, a digital audio player
 Electric Jukebox, a music streaming device
 Musicmatch Jukebox, an Internet-based audio player
 Optical jukebox, a mass storage device
 Personal Jukebox, a handheld digital audio player

Places 
 San Francisco Marriott Marquis, known for its distinctive "jukebox" appearance

See also